TNF receptor-associated factor 4 (TRAF4) also known as RING finger protein 83 (RNF83) is a protein that in humans is encoded by the TRAF4 gene.

TRAF4 is a member of the TNF receptor associated factor (TRAF) family, a family of scaffold proteins. TRAF proteins connect IL-1R/Toll and TNF receptors with signaling factors that lead to the activation of NF-κB and mitogen-activated protein kinases. However, TRAF4 is not known to interact with TNF receptors and its cellular functions are not well understood.

Protein interactions 

TRAF4 has been shown to interact with neurotrophin receptor, p75 (NTR/NTSR1), and negatively regulate NTR induced cell death and NF-kappa B activation. This protein has been found to bind to p47phox, a cytosolic regulatory factor included in a multi-protein complex known as NAD(P)H oxidase. This protein thus, is thought to be involved in the oxidative activation of MAPK8/JNK. Alternatively spliced transcript variants have been observed but the full-length nature of only one has been determined.

A recent report indicates that TRAF4 binds to NOD-Like Receptors NOD1 and NOD2, and specifically inhibits activation of NF-κB by the activated NOD2-RIP2 complex

References

Further reading